Dichomeris isoclera is a moth in the family Gelechiidae. It was described by Edward Meyrick in 1913. It is found in Sri Lanka.

The forewings are fuscous, finely sprinkled with whitish. The stigmata are rather large, blackish, with the plical somewhat beyond the first discal, and an additional dot beneath and slightly before the second discal. The hindwings are grey.

References

Moths described in 1913
isoclera